The 2005–06 Southern Hemisphere tropical cyclone season comprises three different basins. Their respective seasons are:

2005-06 South-West Indian Ocean cyclone season west of 90°E,
2005-06 Australian region cyclone season between 90°E and 160°E, and
2005-06 South Pacific cyclone season east of 160°E.